Paul Grist (born 1939) is a former British television actor. He also appeared in a handful of films such as Under Milk Wood and Are You Being Served?.

Selected roles

Television
 The Avengers (1961)
 Richard the Lionheart (1962)
 199 Park Lane (1965)
 Emergency Ward 10 (1966)
 Triton (1968)
 The Champions (1968)
 The Jazz Age (1968)
 Pegasus (1969)
 The Doctors (1970)
 Doctor Who (1971)
 Dixon of Dock Green (1971)
 New Scotland Yard (1972)
 Perils of Pendragon (1974)
 Kidnapped (1978)
 Blake's 7 (1979)

Film
 A Stitch in Time (1963)
 San Ferry Ann (1965)
 Nobody Runs Forever (1968)
 Under Milk Wood (1972) 
 Are You Being Served? (1977)

References

Bibliography 
Ellen Baskin. Serials on British Television, 1950-1994. Scolar Press, 1996.
Sue Parrill. Nelson's Navy in Fiction and Film: Depictions of British Sea Power in the Napoleonic Era. McFarland, 2009.

External links 
 
 Paul Grist at Theatricalia

1939 births
Living people
British male film actors
British male television actors
People from Glamorgan